Statistics of the Cambodian League for the 2006 season.

Overview
It was contested by 10 teams, and Khemara Keila FC won the championship.

League standings

Note: Resumed Sep 2 after a break of 4 months due to financial problems in the wake of a power struggle within the CFA which led to a temporary suspension by the AFC; league eventually played over 9 rounds instead of 18 as originally planned.

Top final table

Semifinals
07 Oct 2006   Phnomh Penh United 5-1 Keila Rith
07 Oct 2006   Khemara Keila FC 2-1 Nagacorp

Final
14 Oct 2006   Phnomh Penh United 4-5 Khemara Keila FC

References
Cambodia - List of final tables (RSSSF)

C-League seasons
Cambodia
Cambodia
football